Botro (also known as Kouadio Kro) is a town in central Ivory Coast. It is a sub-prefecture of and the seat of Botro Department in Gbêkê Region, Vallée du Bandama District. Botro is also a commune.

In 2014, the population of the sub-prefecture of Botro was 20,337.

Villages
The 53 villages of the sub-prefecture of Botro and their population in 2014 are:

Notes

Sub-prefectures of Gbêkê
Communes of Gbêkê